Utterback is a surname. Notable people with the surname include:

Bill Utterback (1931–2010), illustrator and caricature artist
Camille Utterback (born 1970), interactive installation artist
Hubert Utterback (1880–1942), served on the Iowa Supreme Court, elected to the United States House of Representatives
John G. Utterback (1872–1955), U.S. Representative from Maine, and cousin of Hubert Utterback
Robin Utterback (1949–2007), contemporary artist from Houston, Texas
Sarah Utterback (born 1982), American actress, played Nurse Olivia Harper on ABC's medical drama series Grey's Anatomy
William Irvin Utterback (1872–1949), malacologist
Loyd Stafford "Chip" Utterback (born 1953), Lieutenant General in the United States Air Force

See also